This list is of the Cultural Properties of Japan designated in the category of  for the Prefecture of Okinawa.

National Cultural Properties
As of  1 February 2015, zero Important Cultural Properties have been designated.

Prefectural Cultural Properties
As of 1 May 2014, eleven properties have been designated at a prefectural level.

Municipal Cultural Properties
As of 1 May 2014, six properties have been designated at a municipal level.

See also
 Cultural Properties of Japan
 List of National Treasures of Japan (sculptures)
 List of Historic Sites of Japan (Okinawa)
 List of Cultural Properties of Japan - paintings (Okinawa)

References

External links
  Cultural Properties in Okinawa Prefecture
  List of Cultural Properties in Okinawa Prefecture

Sculptures
Cultural Properties,Okinawa
Scupltures,Okinawa